Burn This World is the debut studio album by American metalcore band The Browning. It was released on October 3, 2011 through Earache Records. This album is currently not available for purchase on all major platforms due to the record label. It was officially uploaded to YouTube on October 14, 2021.

Track listing

Personnel
The Browning
 Jonny McBee – lead vocals, programming
 Brian Cravey – guitars
 Jesse Glidewell – bass
 Noah Robertson – drums

Charts

References

The Browning albums
2011 albums
Earache Records albums